Timmothy Byron Jones (born January 24, 1954) is a former pitcher in Major League Baseball.

Tim Jones reached the major leagues in September 1977. His first two appearances were in relief in games the Pirates were losing badly, and his third was as the starter in the first game of a doubleheader on the final day of the season. He won that game, pitching 7 shutout innings, and in all pitched 10 major league innings without being scored on. He was traded in March 1978 to the Montreal Expos for Will McEnany and never appeared in another major league game, his lifetime record unmarred, 1 win, 0 losses, 0.00 ERA. Jones is the only player in MLB history to have pitched at least 10 innings and not allow a single run.

Teams
 Pittsburgh Pirates 1977

References

Sources

Pittsburgh Pirates players
Major League Baseball pitchers
1954 births
Living people
Baseball players from Sacramento, California
Charleston Charlies players
Charleston Pirates players
Columbus Clippers players
Denver Bears players
Gulf Coast Pirates players
Niagara Falls Pirates players
Shreveport Captains players
Thetford Mines Pirates players